In seven-dimensional geometry, a stericated 7-simplex is a convex uniform 7-polytope with 4th order truncations (sterication) of the regular 7-simplex.

There are 14 unique sterication for the 7-simplex with permutations of truncations, cantellations, and runcinations.

Stericated 7-simplex

Alternate names
 Small cellated octaexon (acronym: sco) (Jonathan Bowers)

Coordinates 
The vertices of the stericated 7-simplex can be most simply positioned in 8-space as permutations of (0,0,0,1,1,1,1,2). This construction is based on facets of the stericated 8-orthoplex.

Images

Bistericated 7-simplex

Alternate names
 Small bicellated hexadecaexon (acronym: sabach) (Jonathan Bowers)

Coordinates 
The vertices of the bistericated 7-simplex can be most simply positioned in 8-space as permutations of (0,0,1,1,1,1,2,2). This construction is based on facets of the bistericated 8-orthoplex.

Images

Steritruncated 7-simplex

Alternate names
 Cellitruncated octaexon (acronym: cato) (Jonathan Bowers)

Coordinates 
The vertices of the steritruncated 7-simplex can be most simply positioned in 8-space as permutations of (0,0,0,1,1,1,2,3). This construction is based on facets of the steritruncated 8-orthoplex.

Images

Bisteritruncated 7-simplex

Alternate names
 Bicellitruncated octaexon (acronym: bacto) (Jonathan Bowers)

Coordinates 

The vertices of the bisteritruncated 7-simplex can be most simply positioned in 8-space as permutations of (0,0,1,1,1,2,3,3). This construction is based on facets of the bisteritruncated 8-orthoplex.

Images

Stericantellated 7-simplex

Alternate names
 Cellirhombated octaexon (acronym: caro) (Jonathan Bowers)

Coordinates 
The vertices of the stericantellated 7-simplex can be most simply positioned in 8-space as permutations of (0,0,0,1,1,2,2,3). This construction is based on facets of the stericantellated 8-orthoplex.

Images

Bistericantellated 7-simplex

Alternate names
 Bicellirhombihexadecaexon (acronym: bacroh) (Jonathan Bowers)

Coordinates 
The vertices of the bistericantellated 7-simplex can be most simply positioned in 8-space as permutations of (0,0,1,1,2,2,3,3). This construction is based on facets of the stericantellated 8-orthoplex.

Images

Stericantitruncated 7-simplex

Alternate names
 Celligreatorhombated octaexon (acronym: cagro) (Jonathan Bowers)

Coordinates 
The vertices of the stericantitruncated 7-simplex can be most simply positioned in 8-space as permutations of (0,0,0,1,1,2,3,4). This construction is based on facets of the stericantitruncated 8-orthoplex.

Images

Bistericantitruncated 7-simplex

Alternate names
 Bicelligreatorhombated octaexon (acronym: bacogro) (Jonathan Bowers)

Coordinates 
The vertices of the bistericantitruncated 7-simplex can be most simply positioned in 8-space as permutations of (0,0,1,1,2,3,4,4). This construction is based on facets of the bistericantitruncated 8-orthoplex.

Images

Steriruncinated 7-simplex

Alternate names
 Celliprismated octaexon (acronym: cepo) (Jonathan Bowers)

Coordinates 
The vertices of the steriruncinated 7-simplex can be most simply positioned in 8-space as permutations of (0,0,0,1,2,2,2,3). This construction is based on facets of the steriruncinated 8-orthoplex.

Images

Steriruncitruncated 7-simplex

Alternate names
 Celliprismatotruncated octaexon (acronym: capto) (Jonathan Bowers)

Coordinates 
The vertices of the steriruncitruncated 7-simplex can be most simply positioned in 8-space as permutations of (0,0,0,1,2,2,3,4). This construction is based on facets of the steriruncitruncated 8-orthoplex.

Images

Steriruncicantellated 7-simplex

Alternate names
 Celliprismatorhombated octaexon (acronym: capro) (Jonathan Bowers)

Coordinates 
The vertices of the steriruncicantellated 7-simplex can be most simply positioned in 8-space as permutations of (0,0,0,1,2,3,3,4). This construction is based on facets of the steriruncicantellated 8-orthoplex.

Images

Bisteriruncitruncated 7-simplex

Alternate names
 Bicelliprismatotruncated hexadecaexon (acronym: bicpath) (Jonathan Bowers)

Coordinates 
The vertices of the bisteriruncitruncated 7-simplex can be most simply positioned in 8-space as permutations of (0,0,1,2,2,3,4,4). This construction is based on facets of the bisteriruncitruncated 8-orthoplex.

Images

Steriruncicantitruncated 7-simplex

Alternate names
 Great cellated octaexon (acronym: gecco) (Jonathan Bowers)

Coordinates 
The vertices of the steriruncicantitruncated 7-simplex can be most simply positioned in 8-space as permutations of (0,0,0,1,2,3,4,5). This construction is based on facets of the steriruncicantitruncated 8-orthoplex.

Images

Bisteriruncicantitruncated 7-simplex

Alternate names
 Great bicellated hexadecaexon (gabach) (Jonathan Bowers)

Coordinates 
The vertices of the bisteriruncicantitruncated 7-simplex can be most simply positioned in 8-space as permutations of (0,0,1,2,3,4,5,5). This construction is based on facets of the bisteriruncicantitruncated 8-orthoplex.

Images

Related polytopes 

This polytope is one of 71 uniform 7-polytopes with A7 symmetry.

Notes

References
 H.S.M. Coxeter: 
 H.S.M. Coxeter, Regular Polytopes, 3rd Edition, Dover New York, 1973 
 Kaleidoscopes: Selected Writings of H.S.M. Coxeter, edited by F. Arthur Sherk, Peter McMullen, Anthony C. Thompson, Asia Ivic Weiss, Wiley-Interscience Publication, 1995,  
 (Paper 22) H.S.M. Coxeter, Regular and Semi Regular Polytopes I, [Math. Zeit. 46 (1940) 380–407, MR 2,10]
 (Paper 23) H.S.M. Coxeter, Regular and Semi-Regular Polytopes II, [Math. Zeit. 188 (1985) 559-591]
 (Paper 24) H.S.M. Coxeter, Regular and Semi-Regular Polytopes III, [Math. Zeit. 200 (1988) 3-45]
 Norman Johnson Uniform Polytopes, Manuscript (1991)
 N.W. Johnson: The Theory of Uniform Polytopes and Honeycombs, Ph.D. 
  x3o3o3o3x3o3o - sco, o3x3o3o3o3x3o - sabach, x3x3o3o3x3o3o - cato, o3x3x3o3o3x3o - bacto, x3o3x3o3x3o3o - caro, o3x3o3x3o3x3o - bacroh, x3x3x3o3x3o3o - cagro, o3x3x3x3o3x3o - bacogro, x3o3o3x3x3o3o - cepo, x3x3x3o3x3o3o - capto, x3o3x3x3x3o3o - capro, o3x3x3o3x3x3o - bicpath, x3x3x3x3x3o3o - gecco, o3x3x3x3x3x3o - gabach

External links 
 Polytopes of Various Dimensions
 Multi-dimensional Glossary

7-polytopes